Maryna Sokolyan is a Ukrainian author. The critical reviews define her work as "uncommon event in a contemporary fiction", and draw attention to the exquisite and well-cultivated language and to the complex intellectual references towards English literature.
She was born 18 December 1979 in Poltava, in the Ukrainian SSR of the Soviet Union (in present-day Ukraine). In 2002 she graduated from Kyiv-Mohyla Academy with an MA in sociology.

Publications

Books 
 Серце гарпії, 2013
 "Vezhi ta pidzemellya/Towers and dungeons", "Grani-T" publishing house, Kiev, 2008
 "Novendialia", "Fact" publishing house, Kiev, 2008
 "Herem" novel", "Fact" publishing house, Kiev, 2007
 "Storonni v domi/Strangers in the House", "Fact" publishing house, Kiev, 2006
 "Kodlo/Gang" (translation), "Idea-press" publishing house, Moscow, 2006
 "Kovdra snovydy/Sleepwalker's Blanket", "Fact" publishing house, Kiev, 2005
 "Balada dlia Kryvoji Vargy/Ballade for the Crooked Varga", "Nora-Druk" publishing house, Kiev, 2005
 "Kodlo/Gang", "Fact" publishing house, Kiev, 2003
 "Tsurpalky/Splinters" short story collection, "Smoloskyp" publishing house, Kiev, 2003

Plays 
 "Retorta/Retort" published by the Sumno.com e-zine, Kiev, 2006
 "Soul lifters and the spirit of capitalism", published by "Nora-Druk" publishing house, Kiev, 2005
 "Dialogues of the Gods", published by "Pokolenije" magazine, Kiev, 2003

Selected awards 
 2008     ESFS encouragement award, Eurocon-2008
 2008     "Portal" prize for the "Herem" novel
 2006     "Koronatsia slova/ Coronation of the word" prize for the "Retorta" play
 2005 Awarded a stipend by "Homines Urbani" program at Villa Decius, Kraków, Poland
 2004	First place for literature in the "Biennale of the modern arts of Ukraine" (for the "Balada dlia Kryvoji Vargy" novel)
 2003	First place in the "StArt" contest for young writers (for the "Kodlo" novel)

References

External links 
 Maryna Sokolyan homepage
 a selection of poetry at СУМНО

1979 births
Living people
Writers from Poltava
National University of Kyiv-Mohyla Academy alumni